Erling Johansen (born 22 October 1944) is a Danish weightlifter. He competed at the 1972 Summer Olympics, the 1976 Summer Olympics and the 1980 Summer Olympics.

References

1944 births
Living people
Danish male weightlifters
Olympic weightlifters of Denmark
Weightlifters at the 1972 Summer Olympics
Weightlifters at the 1976 Summer Olympics
Weightlifters at the 1980 Summer Olympics
Sportspeople from Frederiksberg
20th-century Danish people
21st-century Danish people